Doug Fraser may refer to:

 Doug Fraser (Australian footballer) (1886–1919), Australian rules footballer
 Doug Fraser (Scottish footballer) (born 1941), Scottish football player and manager
 Doug Fraser (rugby union) (born 1992), Canadian rugby union player
 Douglas Fraser (1916–2008), American labor leader
 Douglas M. Fraser (born 1953), US Air Force general